V. V. Vinayak (born 9 October 1974) is an Indian film director and screenwriter known for his works in Telugu films. He is known for directing action comedy and masala films.

Vinayak made his directorial debut with the 2002 film Aadi starring Jr. NTR which was a commercial success. He received the state Nandi Award for Best First Film of a Director for his work in the film. In 2003, Vinayak directed two box office hits Dil starring Nithiin and Tagore starring Chiranjeevi which was screened at the 2006 IIFA Awards held in Dubai.

His other successful films include Bunny (2005), Lakshmi (2006), Krishna (2008), Adhurs (2010), Naayak (2013), and Khaidi No. 150 (2017). In 2013, Vinayak directed a Short film to promote Organ Donation.

Early life 
Gandrothu Veera Venkata Vinayaka Rao, better known as V. V. Vinayak was born on 9 October 1969 in Chagallu of West Godavari district of Andhra Pradesh. His family owned a cinema hall. He was always interested in cinema and used to watch a lot of films in his childhood.

E. V. V. Satyanarayana was a leading director at the time and hailed from Vinayak's neighbouring village Dommeru. He was completed intermediate from his Grand mother house (Dommeru).  At the time of his studies he was very much inspired from EVV Satyanarayana garu and his own house is beside the street of his Grand mother house (Chevvuri Venkata Rao). After completion of education, he was convinced  his father and joined E. V. V. Satyanarayana as an assistant for the film Abbayigaru (1993). Later, he joined director Sagar of has an assistant for the film Amma Donga (1995) and worked with him for six films. Then, he assisted S. V. Krishna Reddy on Sakutumba Saparivara Sametam (2000). He also assisted Kranthi Kumar on Paadutha Theeyaga (1998) and 9 Nelalu (2000).

Filmography

Awards
Nandi Awards
Nandi Award for Best First Film of a Director - Aadi (2002)

Other Awards
Santhosham  Best Commercial Director award By Tharun Sakibanda - Tirupathi - Krishna (2008)

References

External links

Living people
Telugu film directors
21st-century Indian film directors
Screenwriters from Andhra Pradesh
Film directors from Andhra Pradesh
People from West Godavari district
Indian film directors
1974 births
Telugu screenwriters
Indian screenwriters
Nandi Award winners
Santosham Film Awards winners